Jelani Peters (born December 17, 1993) is a Trinidadian professional footballer who plays as a defender for USL Championship side Memphis 901.

Playing career

Club career
Peters played 22 matches with W Connection during the 2016–17 season (18 in league, 4 in Champions League) before being loaned out to American second-tier side Toronto FC II in April 2017, after a preseason trial.

He made his league debut with the team on April 7, appearing as a part of the starting XI in a 0–0 draw with the Rochester Rhinos. After another appearance against Ottawa Fury, Toronto FC II signed Peters to a permanent contract on May 19. Later that day, he played against Tampa Bay Rowdies, again in head coach Jason Bent's starting XI.

In April 2021, Peters signed with Pittsburgh Riverhounds after a successful trial.

On 20 January 2023, Peter moved to USL Championship side Memphis 901.

International career
Peters was called up to the Trinidad and Tobago national team in November 2016, and appeared on the bench in 2018 World Cup qualifying games against Costa Rica and Honduras.

References

External links

One on One with Jelani Peters
 
 
 
 Toronto FC profile

Living people
1993 births
Trinidad and Tobago footballers
Trinidad and Tobago international footballers
Trinidad and Tobago expatriate footballers
Association football defenders
St. Ann's Rangers F.C. players
W Connection F.C. players
Toronto FC II players
TT Pro League players
USL Championship players
Sportspeople from Port of Spain
Trinidad and Tobago expatriate sportspeople in the United States
Expatriate soccer players in the United States
Pittsburgh Riverhounds SC players
Memphis 901 FC players
2021 CONCACAF Gold Cup players